Hyun-soo, also spelled Hyun-su, is a Korean unisex given name. Its meaning differs based on the hanja used to write each syllable of the name. There are 35 hanja with the reading "hyun" and 67 hanja with the reading "soo" on the South Korean government's official list of hanja which may be registered for use in given names.

People with this name include:

Sportspeople
Lee Hyun-soo (born 1968), South Korean male fencer
Kim Hyun-su (born February 1973), South Korean male association football player, formerly of Jeonbuk Hyundai Motors
Kim Hyun-soo (born March 1973), South Korean male association football player, formerly of Daegu FC
Kang Hyun-su (born 1984), North Korean footballer in Japan's J. League Division 2
Viktor An (born Ahn Hyun-soo, 1985), South Korean-born Russian male short track speed skater
Kim Hyun-soo (baseball) (born 1988), South Korean male baseball player, left fielder for the Doosan Bears
Jang Hyun-soo (born 1991), South Korean male footballer, playing for Al-Hilal FC
Jang Hyun-soo (born 1993), South Korean male footballer, playing for Iwate Grulla Morioka
Hwang Hyun-soo (born 1995), South Korean male footballer, playing for FC Seoul

Other
Hyeon Soo Lim (born 1950s), South Korean-born Canadian Presbyterian pastor
Lee Hyeon-su (writer) (born 1959), South Korean writer
Yeo Hyun-soo (born 1982), South Korean actor
Zia Hyunsu Shin (born 1987), South Korean female violinist
Shin Hyun-soo (born 1989), South Korean actor 
Kim Hyun-soo (actress) (born 2000), South Korean actress

Fictional characters with this name include:
Hyeon-su, female character in 2006 South Korean film Cinderella
Lee Hyun-soo, male character in 2012 South Korean television series Shut Up Flower Boy Band
Park Hyun-soo, male character in 2013 South Korean television series Pots of Gold
Cha Hyun-soo, male character in 2020 South Korean Netflix adaptation Sweet Home (TV series)
Do Hyun-soo, male character in 2021 South Korea television series Flower of Evil

See also
List of Korean given names

References

Korean unisex given names